Port Alberni is a city located on Vancouver Island in the province of British Columbia, Canada. The city lies within the Alberni Valley at the head of the Alberni Inlet, Vancouver Island's longest inlet. It is the location of the head offices of the Alberni-Clayoquot Regional District. Port Alberni currently has a total population of 18,259.

Port Alberni is served by the coast-spanning Island Highway system, the Island Rail Corridor, and a local airport.

History

Port Alberni was named for Captain Don Pedro de Alberní, a Spanish officer, who commanded Fort San Miguel at Nootka Sound on Vancouver Island's west coast from 1790 to 1792.

Port Alberni and the West Coast of Vancouver Island is the traditional territory of the Tseshaht and Hupacasath First Nations of the Nuu-Chah-Nulth Tribal Council. The Nuu-chah-nulth were previously called the Nootka. Many place names in Port Alberni have a Nuu-chah-nulth origin, such as Somass (washing), Kitsuksis (log across mouth of creek), Pacheena (foamy), and Nootka (go around). Ancient petroglyph carvings can be found at Sproat Lake.

In March 1787, Captain Charles William Barkley of the Imperial Eagle, explored Barkley Sound, which now bears his name. Barkley travelled with his 17-year-old bride, Frances Barkley, the first European woman to visit what is now British Columbia. Frances Barkley is also the name of one of the two vessels that makes trips down the Alberni Inlet from Port Alberni to Bamfield and Ucluelet. The other, since retired, was the MV Lady Rose.

In 1856, Adam Horne, a Scottish fur trader employed by the Hudson's Bay Company, was directed to locate a land route across Vancouver Island. There were stories that the natives used a trail starting at Qualicum. Adam Horne found this trail leading to the Alberni Valley and it became known as the Horne Lake Trail. Many other settlers used this trail to get to the Alberni Valley.

In 1860, the Anderson company, a sawmilling company from London, England, took the advice of their Victoria agent Captain Edward Stamp and set up a sawmill operation.  At the time, the American Civil War prevented the importation of timber from the southern United States. Gilbert Sproat and Edward Stamp transported men and machinery to Alberni. They received land grants from Governor James Douglas and started running the Anderson sawmill at the mouth of the Somass River in August 1861. The first mill in B.C. was built to export lumber. The original mill failed, but several others were established in the 1880s. Sproat Lake was named after Gilbert Sproat and Stamp Falls and Stamp River were named after Edward Stamp.

Rogers Creek, which flows through the centre of Port Alberni, was named after A.B. Rogers, the discoverer of Rogers Pass, when he surveyed in the Alberni Valley for the Canadian Pacific Railway in the late 19th century.

In 1862, small-scale placer gold mining took place on China Creek; in the 1890s more gold mining took place along the Alberni Inlet at China Creek and Mineral Creek. Several gold veins were found.  Exploration for gold continued over the years with peaks in the 1930s and 1960s.

Port Alberni Mill opened as a kraft pulp mill in 1946, followed by two paper machines in 1957.

Today, the town is a hub for local, regional, and provincial government, and its West Coast General Hospital provides services to west coast communities like Bamfield, Tofino, and Ucluelet. Currently, the natural resources of the area are taking centre stage again, but in a different way. Port Alberni is in the process of "re-developing" itself as a tourism destination. The area's amenities, such as the natural environment of the area, the opportunities for fishing (both marine and freshwater), its convenience as a jumping-off point for new outdoor recreation and ecotourism activities such as hiking, kayaking, and mountain-biking, lend themselves to these activities very well.

The 1946 Vancouver Island earthquake was a 7.3 magnitude earthquake that struck at 10:15 a.m. on Sunday, June 23, 1946. The main shock epicentre occurred in the Forbidden Plateau area north of Port Alberni. While most of the large earthquakes in the Vancouver area occur at tectonic plate boundaries, the 1946 Vancouver Island earthquake was a crustal event. Shaking was felt from Portland, Oregon to Prince Rupert, British Columbia. The earthquake is remembered as one of the most damaging earthquakes in the history of British Columbia.

From 1920 to 1973 the Alberni Residential School was in operation. The Canadian Federal government now says that this was a big blot on race relations in Canada. The residential school system run by the United Church forcibly separated children from their families and communities.   The residential school was closed in the late 1970s and in 2009 was demolished.

In 1955, the Alberni Athletics Senior-A Men's Basketball Team had an outstanding year. The Alberni Athletics won the Canadian Senior Basketball Championships at home. A young Jim Robson honed his sports reporting skills  doing the play-by-play on radio station CJAV. The Alberni Athletics were inducted into the BC Sports Hall of Fame in 2001.

In 1964, Port Alberni was hit by a tsunami during the Good Friday earthquake. The water rose about one foot in a minute reaching ten feet above the high-water mark. About 375 homes were damaged and 55 were washed away, however there were no injuries or fatalities.

In 1967, the neighbouring towns of Alberni (on the north) and Port Alberni (on the south) amalgamated to form the city of Port Alberni.

The Alberni Valley has a museum and many ancillary attractions, including Sproat Lake, which is located just outside Port Alberni.

Geography

Located at the head of the Alberni Inlet, Port Alberni lies adjacent to this natural harbour as well as the Somass River. The other end of the inlet is located on Barkley Sound, which includes the Broken Group Islands, considered to be one of the best areas for kayaking in the world. Kuth-kah-chulth, is the Nuu-Chah-Nulth name for Mount Arrowsmith.

The city itself owes its unique layout to its former "twin city" status, due to its two official city centres, as well as the numerous creeks and ravines that bisect the townsite. The former city of Alberni is now dubbed "North Port", and is centred at Highway 4 and Gertrude Street. Visitors continuing onward to the west coast will pass this intersection, marked by the historic Alberni Post Office on the Southeast corner. Much of Port Alberni's recent development has occurred in the North Port area, especially "up the hill", east of the North Port downtown.

The former City of Port Alberni (now referred to as "South Port" or "Uptown") can be found about  South on 3rd and Argyle street. In 2004, the Capitol Theatre, a local landmark in South Port, underwent extensive renovations and emerged as a stately yet modern relic of past times. This theatre now often hosts live performances. South Port is anchored by the Harbour Quay, a waterfront collection of shops, art galleries, great food and parks. The Port Alberni railway station, farmers market on Saturdays, as well as the Maritime Discovery Centre can be found here.

The city's West End is an eclectic mix of new suburban style homes, large acreages, and two First Nations reserves. Much of the residential growth over the past decade has occurred in the city's West End, where the Westporte neighbourhood has taken shape.

The creeks and ravines that cut through the city create natural barriers; Kitsuksis Creek, Cherry Creek, Roger Creek and Dry Creek each flow through the city.  The hiking trails in these creeks and ravines add tremendously to the quality of life in Port Alberni.

Climate
Port Alberni's dry July gives it a warm-summer Mediterranean climate (Köppen Csb), although it is much wetter than most such places. Although the summer months do see a relatively small amount of precipitation, the vast majority of it comes during the winter months as cool, moist air flows from the Pacific Ocean over the much colder B.C. coast. Despite its location on the relatively drier east side of Vancouver Island, the resulting weak rain shadow is not enough to keep the city dry. Despite its generally wet climate, in summer, afternoon shade temperatures quite often exceed  on average 15–30 days a year, making it one of the warmest places on Vancouver Island in the summer months.

Demographics

The median household income in 2005 for Port Alberni was $43,624.

One major characteristic known is the twin city demographic, where previously there were the distinct Port Alberni and Alberni municipalities, the remnants remain with two distinct city centres.

Ethnicity

Religion 
According to the 2021 census, religious groups in Port Alberni included:
Irreligion (11,365 persons or 63.3%)
Christianity (5,785 persons or 32.2%)
Sikhism (215 persons or 1.2%)
Hinduism (125 persons or 0.7%)
Buddhism (110 persons or 0.6%)
Indigenous Spirituality (85 persons or 0.5%)
Islam (70 persons or 0.4%)
Judaism (30 persons or 0.2%)

Health and education
Public education is offered by School District 70 Alberni, which operates 11 schools in Port Alberni. A new multimillion-dollar state of the art high school opened in 2012–2013.

The Conseil scolaire francophone de la Colombie-Britannique operates one Francophone primary school: école des Grands-cèdres. It also provides a French-English school.

Health services are provided in town by Westcoast General Hospital, operated by the Vancouver Island Health Authority (VIHA).

Economy

The chief source of industry in Port Alberni is forestry, commercial fishing, and tourism.  In the 1950s, 60's and 70's the forestry labour force in Port Alberni was one of the highest paid in the country. However, over the last fifteen years there has been a decline in the forestry industry and a consequent relative decline in the economy of the city and of its residents. The Alberni Valley's forests consist primarily of Douglas fir, hemlock, yellow cedar and western red cedar. Most of the old growth forests have been logged with current logging coming from second growth forests. Port Alberni Mill, owned by Catalyst Paper, sits on the edge of the Alberni Inlet. It produces 340,000 tonnes of directory paper and lightweight coated paper each year. There is also a lumber mill, Alberni Pacific Division, that also sits on the inlet. Several smaller sawmills exist throughout the valley. Farming is also practised in the valley.

Port Alberni also serves as a hub for those travelling to the West Coast of Vancouver Island, including Ucluelet, Tofino and Pacific Rim National Park. As commodities tend to be much pricier in these remote areas, campers and travellers often do their shopping in Port Alberni before continuing their journey. This has resulted in development along the Johnston Road (Highway 4) corridor, including several big box retailers, grocery stores and strip mall developments. Previously, eco-tourism companies have set up shop in the Alberni Valley, taking advantage of the city's location on the fringe of wilderness yet proximate location to Vancouver and Victoria. For example, there's a kayaking, ATV touring, a windsurfing and a glider company.

Salmon
A team of salmon enhancement volunteers and the Department of Fisheries and Oceans have worked to improve salmon habitats throughout the Alberni Valley, adding a Coho hatchery at the McLean Mill National Historic Site, in addition to the successful Robertson Creek Hatchery on the Stamp River. Port Alberni was awarded the World Fishing Network's “Ultimate Fishing Town” designation in 2010.

Attractions

Port Alberni sits beneath Mount Arrowsmith and is almost completely surrounded by mountains. These mountains provide hiking, walking, and mountain biking trails. It also provides an opportunity to view wildlife, including deer and black bears.

The city is also known for its fishing. Its waters contain five different species of salmon and yearly runs of steelhead. Halibut can also be found in the saltwater inlets near the city.

The state-of-the-art Robertson Creek Fish Hatchery is the most successful hatchery on Vancouver Island, producing chinook salmon, coho salmon, and steelhead smolts. It is located a short drive west of Port Alberni. and is open to the public.

Port Alberni is home to the McLean Mill National Historic Site which incorporates a steam railway from the downtown harbour to the saw mill up the valley.  The historic mill offers demonstrations, including operating the old mill.

The world's largest aerial firefighting flying boats, the Martin Mars Water Bombers, once made their home on nearby Sproat Lake. This lake is also a summer destination for local residents and cottagers from surrounding areas. The sole remaining Water Bomber is now owned by The Coulson Group, and has been renamed from the Martin Mars Water Bombers to the Coulson Flying Tankers. The provincial lake also provided petroglyphs carved First Nations many years ago.

Besides the offers from nature, the city has two quays, Harbour Quay and Victoria Quay include shops, restaurants, and art galleries along the inlet. On some autumn evenings, when the inlet's tide is low, black bears can be spotted looking for fish on the other side of Victoria Quay.

The Alberni Valley Multiplex in Port Alberni is home to the Alberni Valley Bulldogs, a Junior-A hockey team in the BCHL.

Della Falls, the 16th tallest waterfall in Canada, is accessible by boat from Great Central Lake or by helicopter. Helicopters are not allowed to land in Strathcona Provincial Park.

Hiking trails around Port Alberni
The Port Alberni area has several hiking trails. There are over 100 trails in and around the Alberni Valley, including mountain bike trails. There is also access to the alpine areas, including Mount Arrowsmith.

 Horne Lake Trail
 Log Train Trail
 Angler's Trail at Stamp River
 Rogers Creek Trail
 Inlet Trail
 Labour Day Lake Trail
 Greenmax Anglers Trail
 China Creek Trail
 Climb Mount Arrowsmith
 Della Falls Trail
 Kitsukis Dyke Walking Path
 Old Forestry Lookout Trail
 Saddle Trail on Mount Arrowsmith

Transportation
The airport has a  runway with another additional  of taxiways and apron. The airport is home to a number of key tenants, including Coulson Aircrane, Canadian Aero Technologies, Alberni Valley Flying Club and Vancouver Island Helicopters.

The main highway to Port Alberni is Highway 4, known locally as the Alberni Highway and the Pacific Rim Highway. The highway to Port Alberni was completed in 1942, and has been designated as Highway 4 since 1953. The highway starts at Qualicum Beach, then reaches Port Alberni from which it continues on to Tofino and Ucluelet.

Port Alberni is served by the Island Rail Corridor branch line from Parksville known as the Port Alberni Subdivision.

Port operations
The Port of Port Alberni regularly receives large oceangoing cargo vessels, such as the Hong Kong-based OYSTER BAY and the Bergen-based STAR LINDESNES, as well as tugs, fishing boats, and search and rescue vessels.

The Port Alberni Port Authority was created in 1999. Under the Canada Marine Act, the Port Alberni Port Authority is responsible for the Alberni Inlet from the Somass River to Tzartus Island.

Notable people
 Paul Boyd, Canadian and American television journalist (Inside Edition)
 Laurent Brossoit, NHL player with the Winnipeg Jets.
 Kim Campbell, 19th Prime Minister of Canada from 25 June to 4 November 1993; the first woman to hold this office.
 George Clutesi (1905–1988) became a  Tseshaht artist, actor and writer as well as an expert on and spokesman for First Nations cultures. In 1959, he received the British Columbia Centennial Award and the Canada Centennial Medal in 1967. He was commissioned to paint a mural for Expo 67. Emily Carr was so impressed with his work that in her will she left him her brushes, oils and unused canvases. He died in Victoria in 1988.
 Travis Cross, Olympic wrestler
Paul Cyr, drafted into the NHL by the Buffalo Sabres in the first round (9th overall) in 1982.
 David Dziurzynski, Ottawa/ Binghamton Senators NHL/ AHL forward.
 Leo, Gerry and Myles Fitzgerald (born August 26, 1993[1]) are Canadian former child actors and current ice hockey players best known for their joint roles as Sylvester (Sly) and Whit in the 1999 film, Baby Geniuses.[2] They also appeared in the sequel, Superbabies: Baby Geniuses 2, in 2004.
 Leonard Frank, photographer
 Rick Hansen, Canadian paraplegic athlete and activist for people with spinal cord injuries who is most famous for his Man in Motion world tour to raise money for the cause and show the physical capabilities of such people.
 Jim Hiller, current assistant coach of the National Hockey League's Toronto Maple Leafs.
 Eric Jespersen, bronze medalist at the 1992 Olympics
 Jamie Lowery, former soccer player and member of Canada's national team at the 1986 World Cup.
 Dakota Morton, youngest Canadian radio host; created the record and set it on January 16, 1999, at the age of 10 years 218 days. Record was awarded while Dakota was hosting his radio show at CJAV radio in Port Alberni.
 Kenneth Oppel, Canadian writer of the Silverwing & Matt Cruse series.
 Davis Payne, current associate coach of Stanley cup champion LA Kings
 Rob Shick, has been with the NHL as an official since September 1, 1984
 Alec Thomas, fisherman, trapper, longshoreman, logger, “anthropologist”, interpreter, and Tseshaht politician.
 Harry Zolnierczyk, Nashville Predators forward
 Jim Robson, the iconic voice of the Vancouver Canucks, started his legendary broadcasting career in Port Alberni 
 Bryer Schmegelsky and Kam McLeod, primary suspects of the 2019 Northern British Columbia murders of a tourist couple and UBC professor, and were subjects of a nationwide manhunt.
 Lauren Spencer-Smith is a singer who appeared on season 18 of American Idol and became popular on TikTok in 2021 with songs like "Back to Friends" and "Fingers Crossed". 
 Michael de Leur, Library Manager, Vancouver Island Regional Library. A public plebiscite created the Port Alberni library 1936. In 1938, it was located in the back of McVicar's Drug Store, where store employees acted as library attendants. 34 years later, in 1972, the library moved to the Echo Centre and underwent a major refurbishment and expansion in 2007.

See also
 Alberni Valley Heritage Network
 Bainbridge Lake
 CJAV-FM 93.3 (known on-air as "The Peak")
 Cox Lake (British Columbia)
 MyAlberni

Notes

References

External links

 
Cities in British Columbia
Populated places on the British Columbia Coast